Michael Aitken (born 12 January 1960) is a former Australian rules footballer who played with Carlton in the Victorian Football League (VFL).

Notes

External links 

Michael Aitken's profile on Blueseum

1960 births
Carlton Football Club players
Claremont Football Club players
Australian rules footballers from Western Australia
Living people
Western Australian State of Origin players